Ardaite is a very rare sulfosalt mineral with chemical formula Pb19Sb13S35Cl7 in the monoclinic crystal system, named after the Arda River, which passes through the type locality. It was discovered in 1978 and approved by the International Mineralogical Association in 1980. It was the second  well-defined natural chlorosulfosalt, after dadsonite.

Greenish gray or bluish green in color, its luster is metallic. Ardaite occurs as 50 µm fine-grained aggregates of acicular crystals associated with galena, pyrostilpnite, anglesite, nadorite, and chlorine-bearing robinsonite and semseyite, in the Madjarovo polymetallic ore deposit in Bulgaria. Ardaite has a hardness of 2.5 to 3 on Mohs scale and a density of approximately 6.44.

The type locality is the Madjarovo polymetallic ore deposit in the Rhodope Mountains. Later its occurrence was proved in the Gruvåsen deposit, near Filipstad, Bergslagen, Sweden.

See also 
List of minerals recognized by the International Mineralogical Association

References

External links
 

Sulfosalt minerals
Lead minerals
Monoclinic minerals
Antimony minerals